Kaistarniemi (Finnish; Kaistarudden in Swedish) is a district and a suburb of the city of Turku, in Finland. It is located in the eastern part of the island of Hirvensalo, off the city's coastline.

The current population of Kaistarniemi is 630, and it is increasing at an annual rate of 9.21%. 26.03% of the district's population are under 15 years old, while 12.22% are over 65. The district's linguistic makeup is 87.62% Finnish, 9.68% Swedish, and 2.70% other.

See also
 Districts of Turku
 Districts of Turku by population

Districts of Turku